Hendrick Tejonihokarawa (Tay yon’ a ho ga rau’ a), also known as Tee Yee Neen Ho Ga Row and Hendrick Peters (1660 – ) was a pro-English leader of the Mohawk in the Province of New York in the early 18th century.  He was one of the "Four Mohawk Kings" who went to London in 1710 to meet with Queen Anne of Great Britain and her court to mark a treaty with her. The chiefs requested the Queen's help in controlling French influence in New York and asked for English missionaries to help their people offset French Catholic influence. The Mohawk diplomacy helped the Iroquois preserve their power through the colonial years.

Early life and education
Tejonihokarawa was born into the Wolf Clan of his mother; the Mohawk and all Iroquoian nations had a matrilineal kinship system, in which descent and social status were passed through the maternal line. The English translation of his name is "open the door", suggesting he may have had the responsibility for opening the longhouse door to receive visitors.

He was given the name Hendrick Peters in July 1690 when he was baptized by Godfridius Dellius as a Christian and member of the Dutch Reformed Church. According to the anthropologist Dean Snow, Peters later became a Protestant preacher. He lived in the lower Mohawk village known as Tionondoroge, along the Mohawk River. The English built Fort Hunter here, where Schoharie Creek entered the Mohawk River.

Career
By 1710, Tejonihokarawa may have been selected as one of three Wolf Clan sachems, with the title Sharenhowaneh.  The sachems were chosen by the women elders of the clan. His actions helped build the alliance with the English and preserve the Iroquois Confederacy as a key power to be reckoned with in North America in the early 18th century. He met with English leaders at Albany to preserve Mohawk territory to the west throughout the Mohawk River Valley. Other nations of the Iroquois had territories to the west and north of there, closer to the Great Lakes.

He and two other Mohawk chiefs, in addition to a Mahican chief, sailed to London in 1710 to meet with Queen Anne and her court, to mark a treaty. While in London, Tejonihokarawa requested Anglican missionaries to help offset French Catholic influence in Iroquois territory.  After the French severely damaged Mohawk villages in 1666, they had forced the people to accept Catholic Jesuits as missionaries. The Jesuits soon set up a base near what later developed as Auriesville, New York, a few miles west of Schoharie Creek. They had been working to recruit Mohawk converts in present-day New York. Numerous converted Mohawk had migrated to the St. Lawrence River area, settling at the mission village of Kahnawake south of Montreal.

Queen Anne sent Anglican missionaries to the New York Colony in 1711, who established a mission and chapel at Fort Hunter. The nearby Mohawk village became largely Christianized within years.

In turn, Queen Anne had asked Tejonihokarawa for help in resettling Palatine German refugees in New York. They had been working at English camps in the Hudson Valley to pay off their passage to the colony and wanted their own lands. Through Governor Robert Hunter, Tejonihokarawa offered Mohawk land in his territory to the refugees, some of whom took land near Schoharie Creek.

Tejonihokarawa was deposed by Wolf Clan matrons in the winter of 1712-1713, apparently because of differences with the missionaries.  By 1720 he had been restored to power, as he was noted as sachem in colonial records. In 1723, a group of 100 Germans were given grants of Mohawk land west of present-day Little Falls, in what is now known as the Burnetsfield Patent in the Mohawk Valley, on both sides of the river.  They started other settlements as well. This area was upriver and west of existing Dutch and English settlements, as well as the upper Mohawk village of Canajoharie.

Tejonihokarawa also traveled to northern New England, trying to build alliances with the Abenaki there, but he was prevented from meeting with them. They had frequently allied with the French in this period.

Until Barbara Sivertsen's work published in 1996, biographical details concerning Tejonihokarawa, or King Hendrick, have frequently been confused with the similarly named Hendrick Theyanoguin, who was three decades younger.

References

Sources
 Eric Hinderaker, The Two Hendricks: Unraveling a Mohawk Mystery. Cambridge, Massachusetts: Harvard University Press, 2010.
 Barbara J. Sivertsen, Turtles, Wolves, and Bears: A Mohawk Family History (1996), reprint Heritage Books, 2007
 Snow, Dean R. "Searching for Hendrick: Correction of a Historic Conflation". New York History, Summer 2007

Further reading
 Fintan O'Toole, White Savage: William Johnson and the Invention of America, New York: Farrar, Straus and Giroux, 2005
 Timothy J. Shannon, Iroquois Diplomacy on the Early American Frontier, New York: Viking, 2008; paperback, The Penguin Library of American Indian History, 2009

1660 births
American Mohawk people
1735 deaths
American members of the Dutch Reformed Church